Haakon Martin Evjenth (17 July 1865 – 16 November 1934) was a Norwegian politician for the Liberal Party. He was Minister of Justice 1928–1930. Evjenth was a barrister by profession.

He was the father of jurist and children's writer Håkon Evjenth.

References

1865 births
1934 deaths
Government ministers of Norway
Politicians from Bodø
Ministers of Justice of Norway